Renée Forte Teixeira (born March 27, 1987) is a Brazilian mixed martial artist who formerly fought in the lightweight division of the Ultimate Fighting Championship. He was a competitor on The Ultimate Fighter: Brazil.

MMA career

Early career
Forte compiled a 7-1 professional record before joining The Ultimate Fighter: Brazil cast.

The Ultimate Fighter
Forte was selected to compete on the inaugural season of The Ultimate Fighter: Brazil. Forte got into the house with a decision win over Fabio Luiz Vital da Costa.

In his opening round fight, Forte was submitted by Daniel Sarafian in the second round with a rear naked choke.

Ultimate Fighting Championship
Forte made his official UFC debut against castmate Sérgio Moraes on October 13, 2012 at UFC 153. He lost the fight via submission in the third round.

In his next fight, Forte made his lightweight debut against Terry Etim on February 16, 2013 at UFC on Fuel TV: Barão vs. McDonald. He won the fight via unanimous decision.

Forte faced John Makdessi on September 21, 2013 at UFC 165. He lost the fight by first round KO.

In his fourth UFC fight, Forte faced promotional newcomer Francisco Treviño on March 15, 2014 at UFC 171. He lost the fight via unanimous decision, and was subsequently released from the promotion shortly after.

Mixed martial arts record

|-
|  Loss
| align=center| 8–4
| Francisco Treviño
| Decision (unanimous)
| UFC 171
| 
| align=center| 3
| align=center| 5:00
| Dallas, Texas, United States
| 
|-
|  Loss
| align=center| 8–3
| John Makdessi
| KO (punches)
| UFC 165
| 
| align=center| 1
| align=center| 2:01
| Toronto, Ontario, Canada
| 
|-
|  Win
| align=center| 8–2
| Terry Etim
| Decision (unanimous)
| UFC on Fuel TV: Barão vs. McDonald
| 
| align=center| 3
| align=center| 5:00
| London, England, United Kingdom
| 
|-
|  Loss
| align=center| 7–2
| Sérgio Moraes
| Submission (rear-naked choke)
| UFC 153
| 
| align=center| 3
| align=center| 3:10
| Rio de Janeiro, Brazil
| 
|-
|  Win
| align=center| 7–1
| Renan Santos
| TKO (retirement)
| Amazon Fight 8
| 
| align=center| 3
| align=center| 1:52
| Belem, Pará, Brazil
|
|-
|  Loss
| align=center| 6–1
| Mario Sartori
| KO (punch)
| International Fighter Championship
| 
| align=center| 2
| align=center| 3:10
| Recife, Pernambuco, Brazil
|
|-
|  Win
| align=center| 6–0
| Anderson Melo
| TKO (punches)
| Champions Night 14
| 
| align=center| 1
| align=center| 1:38
| Fortaleza, Ceará, Brazil
|
|-
|  Win
| align=center| 5–0
| Julio Cesar Andrade
| Decision (split)
| Shooto Brazil 14
| 
| align=center| 3
| align=center| 5:00
| Flamengo, Rio de Janeiro, Brazil
|
|-
|  Win
| align=center| 4–0
| Ramon Dias
| Decision (unanimous)
| Jungle Fight 13
| 
| align=center| 3
| align=center| 5:00
| Fortaleza, Ceará, Brazil
|
|-
|  Win
| align=center| 3–0
| Jeferson dos Santos
| Submission (rear-naked choke)
| Kabra Fight Nordeste
| 
| align=center| 1
| align=center| N/A
| Fortaleza, Ceará, Brazil
|
|-
|  Win
| align=center| 2–0
| Andre Vasconcelos
| Decision (unanimous)
| Furia Fight 3
| 
| align=center| 3
| align=center| 5:00
| Fortaleza, Ceará, Brazil
|
|-
|  Win
| align=center| 1–0
| Elinardo Silva Costa
| Submission (armbar)
| Rino's FC 1
| 
| align=center| N/A
| align=center| N/A
| Fortaleza, Ceará, Brazil
|

See also
List of male mixed martial artists

References

External links
 

1987 births
Living people
Brazilian Muay Thai practitioners
Brazilian male karateka
Brazilian practitioners of Brazilian jiu-jitsu
Brazilian male mixed martial artists
Lightweight mixed martial artists
Welterweight mixed martial artists
Mixed martial artists utilizing Muay Thai
Mixed martial artists utilizing karate
Mixed martial artists utilizing Brazilian jiu-jitsu
People awarded a black belt in Brazilian jiu-jitsu
Ultimate Fighting Championship male fighters
Sportspeople from Fortaleza
21st-century Brazilian people